O Baixo Miño is a comarca in the Galician province of Pontevedra. The area covers 315.1 km2, and the overall population of this comarca was 50,978 at the 2011 Census; the latest official estimate (as at the start of 2018) was 49,646. To the west of O Baixo Miño lies the Atlantic Ocean and to its southeast is the Minho River, which forms a natural boundary with Portugal.

Important Sites and Events
The region is a socially, culturally and religiously rich place. There is the Minho Estuary, which is a true haven for bird enthusiasts. And every August there is the cultural showcase of Festas do Monte. Another interesting site in the region is the Monte Aloia, Galicia's first natural park.

Municipalities
The comarca comprises the following five municipalities:

References

Comarcas of the Province of Pontevedra